Erckmann-Chatrian was the name used by French authors Émile Erckmann (1822–1899) and Alexandre Chatrian (1826–1890), nearly all of whose works were jointly written.

History
Both Erckmann and Chatrian were born in the département of Meurthe (now Moselle), in the Lorraine region in the extreme north-east of France. They specialised in military fiction and ghost stories in a rustic mode  Lifelong friends who first met in the spring of 1847, they finally quarreled during the mid-1880s, after which they did not produce any more stories jointly. During 1890 Chatrian died, and Erckmann wrote a few pieces under his own name.

Many of Erckmann-Chatrian's works were translated into English by Adrian Ross.

Tales of supernatural horror by the duo that are well known in English include "The Wild Huntsman" (tr. 1871), "The Man-Wolf" (tr. 1876) and "The Crab Spider." These stories received praise from the renowned English ghost story writer, M. R. James, as well as H. P. Lovecraft.

Erckmann-Chatrian wrote numerous historical novels, some of which attacked the Second Empire in anti-monarchist terms. Partly as a result of their republicanism, they were praised by Victor Hugo and Émile Zola, and fiercely attacked in the pages of Le Figaro. Gaining popularity from 1859 for their nationalistic, anti-militaristic and anti-German sentiments, they were well-selling authors but had trouble with political censorship throughout their careers. Generally the novels were written by Erckmann, and the plays mostly by Chatrian.

A festival in their honour is held every summer in the town of Erckmann's birth, Phalsbourg (German Pfalzburg), which also contains a military museum exhibiting editions of their works.

Works

First works
Many of these were not published until the 1860s.
Malédiction; Vin rouge et vin blanc (1849)
L’Alsace en 1814, play (1850)
Science et génie, fantasy story (1850)
Schinderhannes ou les Brigands des Vosges (1852)
Le Bourgmestre en bouteille (by Erckmann, 1856)
L’Illustre Docteur Mathéus (1856)
Contes fantastiques: Le Requiem du corbeau, Rembrandt et L’Œil invisible (1857)
Gretchen et La Pie (1858)

From 1859
Les Lunettes de Hans Schnaps (1859)
Le Rêve du cousin Elof (1859)
La Montre du doyen (1859)
Hans Storkus (1859)
Les Trois âmes (1859)
Hugues-le-loup (1859) – this notable tale of a werewolf has been translated into English as "The Man-Wolf" (1876)
La Tresse Noire (1859) 
Contes de la montagne; Contes fantastiques (1860)
Maître Daniel Rock (1861)
Le Fou Yégof (1861)
L’Invasion ou le Fou Yégof (1862)
Les Contes du bord du Rhin (1862)
Confidences d’un joueur de clarinette (1862)
Madame Thérèse (1863)
La Taverne du jambon de Mayence (1863)
Confidences d’un joueur de clarinette (1863)
Les Amoureux de Catherine (1863)
Histoire d’un conscrit de 1813 (1864)
L’Ami Fritz (1864)
Waterloo (sequel to Conscrit de 1813, 1865)
Histoire d’un homme du peuple (1865)
La Maison forestière (1866)
La Guerre (1866)
Le Blocus (1866)
Contes et romans populaires (1867)
Le Juif polonais,  play (1867)
Histoire d’un paysan (1867)

After the Franco-Prussian War
Histoire du plébiscite racontée par un des 7 500 000 oui, essay (1871)
Lettre d’un électeur à son député, pamphlet against reactionaries (1871)
Les Deux Frères (1871)
Histoire d’un sous-maître (1871)
Une campagne en Kabylie (1873)
Les Années de collège de Maître Nablot (1874)
Le Brigadier Frédéric, histoire d’un Français chassé par les Allemands (1874)
Maître Gaspard Fix, histoire d’un conservateur (1875)
L’Education d’un féodal (1875)
L’Intérêt des paysans, lettre d’un cultivateur aux paysans de France, essay (1876)
Contes et romans alsaciens (1876)
Souvenirs d’un ancien chef de chantier à l’isthme de Suez (1876)
Les Amoureux de Catherine and L’Ami Fritz, plays (adapted by Chatrian, 1877)
Contes vosgiens (1877)
Alsace ou les fiancés d’Alsace, play (adapted by Chatrian from Histoire du plébiscite, 1880)
Le Grand-père Lebigre (1880)
Les Vieux de la vieille (1880)
Quelques mots sur l’esprit humain, résumé de la philosophie d’Erckmann, essay (1880)
Le Banni (sequel to Le Brigadier Frédéric, 1881)
La Taverne des Trabans, play (adapted from La Taverne du jambon de Mayence, 1881)
Les Rantzau, play (adapted from Deux Frères, 1882)
Madame Thérèse, play (adapted by Chatrian, 1882)
Le Banni (1882)
Le Fou Chopine, play (adapted from Gretchen, 1883)
Époques mémorables de l’Histoire de France: avant ’89 (1884)
Myrtille, play (1885)
L’Art et les grands idéalistes, essay (1885)
Pour les enfants, essay (published 1888)

English translations
The Man-Wolf and Other Tales (1876, rpt 1976)
Strange Stories (1880)
Best Tales of Terror (1980) edited by Hugh Lamb

References

Bibliography
Benoît-Guyod, G. La Vie et l'Œuvre d'Erckmann-Chatrian. Témoignages et documents. Tome 14, Jean-Jacques Pauvert, Paris, 1963.
Hinzelin, Émile. Erckmann-Chatrian. Étude biographique et littéraire. J. Ferenczi et fils, Paris, 1922.
Schoumacker, L. Erckmann-Chatrian. Étude biographique et critique d'après des documents inédits. Les Belles-Lettres, Paris, 1933.

External links
 Erckmann-Chatrian, first Website entirely dedicated to the Lives and Works of Erckmann-Chatrian (in French).
 
 

1822 births
1899 deaths
1826 births
1890 deaths
People from Moselle (department)

19th-century French novelists
Fabulists
Collective pseudonyms
Writing duos
French fantasy writers
French horror writers
Ghost story writers
French historical novelists
French male novelists
French male short story writers
French short story writers
Lorraine-German people
19th-century short story writers
19th-century French male writers